Khalil-ur-Rahman Sajjad Nomani (or only Sajjad Nomani) (born 12 August 1955) is an Indian Islamic scholar, spokesperson of All India Muslim Personal Law Board, educator and author of many Islamic books. He is a scholar of Islam. With BAMCEF and Waman Meshram, Nomani initiated various activism initiatives, primarily for right of minorities of India.

Early life 

Nomani was born in year 1955 in Lucknow, India. His father Manzur Nu'mani was also a prominent Islamic scholar, theologian, journalist, writer, and social activist. His grandfather Sufi Muhammad Husain, was a businessman and landlord.

Nomani received his education in his hometown, graduating from Darul Uloom Nadwatul Ulama and Darul Uloom Deoband. Later he studied at the Islamic University of Madinah and completed a doctorate in Quranic Studies.

Nomani is a sheikh, scholar and teacher of the Naqshbandi order, a major Sunni spiritual order of Sufism. He is a disciple of Zulfiqar Ahmad Naqshbandi.

Activism 
All India Muslim Personal Law Board launched a movement to safeguard constitutional rights and faith of religious minorities titled "Deen aur Dastur Bachao" (Save Religion-Save Constitution) campaign. This campaign was led by Nomani, who travelled throughout the country to create awareness. He also called for joined initiative with the government, law enforcing agencies, religious scholars and media to prevent Indian Youth from getting attracted to terror outfits.

Nomani ran a campaign with BAMCEF and scholars of different religions like Christians, Sikhs, Lingayats (Karnataka) and several tribal communities to campaign against Uniform Civil Code.

Nomani also took part in the Citizenship Amendment Act Protests and called for a Bharat Bandh to protest the controversial law.

Literary works
 Kya Ab Bhi Na Jagoge?
 Al-Furqan (monthly journal started by his father Manzur Nu'mani).

References 

Indian Muslim scholars of Islam
Urdu-language writers from India
Living people
Indian human rights activists
Hadith scholars
1955 births
Scholars from Uttar Pradesh
Indian civil rights activists
Indian Muslim activists
Scholars from Lucknow
Indian Sufi religious leaders
Indian Sufis
Indian religious leaders
Deobandis
Indian Islamic studies scholars